Robin Hood of the Pecos  is a 1941 American Western film directed by Joseph Kane and  starring Roy Rogers.

Cast
 Roy Rogers as Vance Corbin
 George "Gabby" Hayes as Gabriel "Gabby" Hornaday
 Marjorie Reynolds as Jeanie Grayson 
 Cy Kendall as Ambrose Ballard 
 Leigh Whipper as Kezeye 
 Sally Payne as Belle Starr 
 Eddie Acuff as Sam Starr

External links
 

1941 films
1941 Western (genre) films
American Western (genre) films
Republic Pictures films
American black-and-white films
Films directed by Joseph Kane
1940s English-language films
1940s American films